Río Guanaco is a hamlet on Navarino Island in the Tierra del Fuego archipelago in southern Chile.  It is part of the Cabo de Hornos commune in Antártica Chilena Province.

References

Navarino Island
Hamlets in Chile
Populated places in Antártica Chilena